This is a list of the heads of mission from the Habsburg Monarchy, Austrian Empire, and later Austria-Hungary, to the Court of St James's in London.

Habsburg Envoy  
1677-1679: Charles Ferdinand, Count of Waldstein
1680-1685: Franz Sigismund von Thurn und Taxis 
1685-1687: Georg Adam Martinitz
1687-1687: Dominik Andreas von Kaunitz ("vicelegato")
1690-1690: Sigismund Wilhelm von Königsegg
1691-1693: Heinrich Johann Franz von Strattmann
1694-1700: Leopold von Auersperg  
1701-1703: Johann Wenzel Wratislaw von Mitrowitz
1705-1711: Johann Wenzel von Gallas
1715-1717: Otto Christoph von Volckra 
1717-1718: Johann Christoph Pentenriedter
1724-1727: Conrad Sigmund von Starhemberg
1726-1727: Karl Joseph von Palm  
1727-1728: Giulio Visconti Borromeo Arese
1728-1736: Philipp Joseph Kinsky
1736-1740: Ignaz Johann Wasner
1740-1741: Johann Franz Heinrich Carl von Ostein	 	
1741-1743: Anton von Zöhrern	
1743-1748: Ignaz Johann von Wasner	 	
1748-1749: Anton von Zöhrern	
1749-1752: Heinrich von Richecourt	 
1752-1753: Anton von Zöhrern	 
1753-1757: Carl Ludwig von Colloredo	 	
1757-1763: vacant	 		
1763-1769: Christian August von Seiler
1769-1770: Johann Lukas von Raigersfeld
1770-1782: Ludovico, Count di Belgiojoso
1782-1786: Johann Friedrich von Kageneck	 			
1786-1790: Karl Emeryk Aleksander Reviczky von Revisnye
1790-1793: Johann Philipp Stadion, Count von Warthausen
1793-1800: Ludwig, Prince of Starhemberg

Ambassador extraordinary and plenipotentiary of the Austrian Empire
 1800-1810: Ludwig, Prince of Starhemberg
 1810-1814: vacant
 1814-1815: Maximilian, Count of Merveldt
 1815–1815: Baron Philipp von Neumann
 1815–1842: Paul III Anton, Prince Esterházy
 1843–1844: Baron Philipp von Neumann
 1844–1848: Count Jan Moritz von Dietrichstein-Proskau-Leslie

Envoy extraordinary
 1849–1849: Count Franz de Paula von Colloredo-Wallsee
 1851–1852: Count Karl Ferdinand von Buol-Schauenstein
 1852–1856: Count Franz de Paula von Colloredo-Wallsee
 1856–1860: Count Rudolf Apponyi

Ambassador extraordinary and plenipotentiary
 1860–1871: Count Rudolf Apponyi
 1871–1878: Count Friedrich Ferdinand von Beust
 1878–1888: Count Alajos Károlyi
 1888–1903: Count Franz von Deym von Stritez
 1904–1914: Count Albert Mensdorff-Pouilly, von Dietrichstein zu Nikolsburg

Ambassadors of the Republic of Austria
See Ambassadors of the Republic of Austria

See also

 List of diplomatic missions of Austria-Hungary

References

 https://web.archive.org/web/20110612032030/http://www.mfa.gov.hu/kulkepviselet/UK/en/en_nk_tortenete/ambassadors.htm?printable=true

Austria-Hungary
Ambassadors to the United Kingdom
Ambassadors to the United Kingdom